Andriy Kokhanovsky (born 11 January 1968) is a Ukrainian athlete. He competed in the men's discus throw at the 1996 Summer Olympics.

References

1968 births
Living people
Athletes (track and field) at the 1996 Summer Olympics
Ukrainian male discus throwers
Olympic athletes of Ukraine
Place of birth missing (living people)